

General Elections

Legislative Assembly elections

Arunachal Pradesh

Bihar

Goa, Daman and Diu

Gujarat

Kerala

Madhya Pradesh

Sources:

Maharashtra

Manipur

Odisha

|- style="background-color:#E9E9E9; text-align:center;"
! class="unsortable" |
! Political Party !! Flag !! Seats  Contested !! Won !! Net Change  in seats !! % of  Seats
! Votes !! Vote % !! Change in vote %
|- style="background: #90EE90;"
| 
| style="text-align:left;" |Indian National Congress (I)
| 
| 147 || 118 || "NEW" || 80.27 || 30,37,487 || 47.78 || "NEW"
|-
|
| style="text-align:left;" |Indian National Congress (U)
|
| 98 || 2 || "NEW" || 1.36 || 4,46,818 || 10.49 || "NEW"
|-
| 
| style="text-align:left;" |Bharatiya Janata Party
|
| 28 || 0 || NA || 0|| 86,421 || 7.09 || NA
|-
| 
| style="text-align:left;" |Communist Party of India
| 
| 27 || 4 ||  0|| 3.57 || 2,33,971 || 2.72 ||  3.4
|-
| 
|
| 248 || 7 || N/A || 4.76 || 7,55,087 || 15.77 || N/A
|- class="unsortable" style="background-color:#E9E9E9"
! colspan = 3|
! style="text-align:center;" |Total Seats !! 147 ( 7) !! style="text-align:center;" |Voters !! 1,39,09,115 !! style="text-align:center;" |Turnout !! colspan = 2|65,49,074 (47.08%)
|}

Puducherry

Punjab

Rajasthan

Tamil Nadu

|-
! style="background-color:#E9E9E9;text-align:left;vertical-align:top;" |Alliance/Party
!style="width:4px" |
! style="background-color:#E9E9E9;text-align:right;" |Seats won
! style="background-color:#E9E9E9;text-align:right;" |Change
! style="background-color:#E9E9E9;text-align:right;" |Popular Vote
! style="background-color:#E9E9E9;text-align:right;" |Vote %
! style="background-color:#E9E9E9;text-align:right;" |Adj. %‡
|-
! style="background-color:#009900; color:white"|AIADMK+ alliance
! style="background-color: " | 
| 162
| +14
| 9,328,839
| colspan=2 style="text-align:center;vertical-align:middle;"| 48.9%
|-
|AIADMK
! style="background-color: #008000" |
| 129
| -1
| 7,303,010
| 38.8%
| 50.4%
|-
|CPI(M)
! style="background-color: #000080" |
| 11
| -1
| 596,406
| 3.2%
| 47.6%
|-
|CPI
! style="background-color: #0000FF" |
| 9
| +4
| 501,032
| 2.7%
| 43.9%
|-
|GKC
! style="background-color: teal" |
| 6
| +6
| 322,440
| 1.7%
| 44.1%
|-
|IND
! style="background-color: olive" |
| 6
| +6
| 488,296
| 2.6%
| 
|-
|FBL
! style="background-color: #800000" |
| 1
| –
| 65,536
| 0.4%
| 44.6%
|-
|INC(U)
! style="background-color:" |
| 0
| –
| 52,119
| 0.3%
| 29.3%
|-
! style="background-color:#FF0000; color:white"|DMK+ alliance
! style="background-color: " |
| 69
| -6
| 8,371,718
| colspan=2 style="text-align:center;vertical-align:middle;"| 44.4%
|-
|DMK
! style="background-color: #FF0000" |
| 37
| -11
| 4,164,389
| 22.1%
| 45.7%
|-
|INC(I)
! style="background-color: #00FFFF" |
| 31
| +4
| 3,941,900
| 20.9%
| 43.4%
|-
|IND
! style="background-color: lime" |
| 1
| +1
| 265,429
| 1.4%
| 
|-
! style="background-color:gray; color:white"|Others
! style="background-color:gray" |
| 3
| -8
| 1,144,449
| colspan=2 style="text-align:center;vertical-align:middle;"| 6.1%
|-
|JNP(JP)
! style="background-color: #FFFF00" |
| 2
| -8
| 522,641
| 2.8%
| 6.9%
|-
|IND
! style="background-color: #666666" |
| 1
| –
| 598,897
| 3.2%
| –
|-
| style="text-align:center;" |Total
! style="background-color: " |
| 234
| –
| 18,845,006
| 100%
| style="text-align:center;" | –
|-
|}
‡: Vote % reflects the percentage of votes the party received compared to the entire electorate that voted in this election. Adjusted (Adj.) Vote %, reflects the % of votes the party received per constituency that they contested.
Sources: Election Commission of India and Keesing's Report

Uttar Pradesh

References

External links

 Election Commission of India

1980 elections in India
India
1980 in India
Elections in India by year